Paul Johnson (October 9, 1966 – June 10, 2020) was a Canadian wheelchair tennis player and Paralympic athlete who competed at international level events and was Canada's former number one wheelchair tennis player. He participated at the Paralympic Games four times; he competed in athletics once at the 1988 Summer Paralympics then played wheelchair tennis three times consecutively from 1992 to 2000.

Johnson died at the age of 53 in his hometown.

References

1966 births
2020 deaths
Athletes from Victoria, British Columbia
Paralympic wheelchair tennis players of Canada
Paralympic track and field athletes of Canada
Athletes (track and field) at the 1988 Summer Paralympics
Wheelchair tennis players at the 1992 Summer Paralympics
Wheelchair tennis players at the 1996 Summer Paralympics
Wheelchair tennis players at the 2000 Summer Paralympics
Canadian male wheelchair racers
Canadian male tennis players